A series of protests began in Colombia on 26 September 2022 against left-wing cross-sectoral structural reforms of the State requiring a record-breaking taxation, proposed by the government of President Gustavo Petro in order to respond to the challenges of the post-COVID-19 pandemic times. Following his inauguration on 7 August 2022, the newly installed President Petro put forward legislative bill proposals to reform the defense sector and the military police, open peace negotiations with the ELN and other armed guerrilla groups, reestablish bilateral relations with Venezuela, change the legal framework regarding drug use and narcotrafficking, and introduce tax reforms, among others.

In large cities such as Bogotá, Medellín and Cali, hundreds of protesters took to the streets. The national protest organizing committee "No Más Petro" has scheduled new rounds of protests every month, the second to be held on 24 October 2022.

See also

 2018 student protests in Colombia
 2019–2020 Colombian protests
 Javier Ordóñez protests
 2021 Colombian protests
 Protests over responses to the COVID-19 pandemic
 List of protests in the 21st century

References

External links
 National Protest Organizing Committee "No Más Petro"

Protests
2022 protests
September 2022 events in South America
Articles containing video clips
Protests over responses to the COVID-19 pandemic